Pseudobambusa schizostachyoides is a species of bamboo in the monotypic genus Pseudobambusa, of the tribe Bambuseae (family Poaceae).  No subspecies are listed in the Catalogue of Life.

Distribution and description 
The recorded distribution includes the Andaman Islands, Myanmar and Vietnam: where the plant is called nứa, although this name may also apply to the genus Schizostachyum.

This bamboo grows as a plant from 3 to 10 m tall, with thin-walled internodes up to 600 mm long.  Leaves are from 100-180 mm long.

References

External links 
 

schizostachyoides
Flora of Indo-China